The 1916–17 season was Stoke's second season in the non-competitive War League.

With the start of World War I, all Football League football was cancelled. In its place were formed War Leagues, based on geographical lines rather than based on previous league placement. Stoke contested the Lancashire Section in the Principal Tournament, and the Lancashire Section Secondary Competition Group D. However, none of these were considered to be competitive football, and thus their records are not recognised by the Football League.

Season review
In the Primary Competition of the Lancashire League Stoke finished in 3rd place with 39 points whilst in the Secondary Competition they finished 2nd with 6 points. During this season the lowest ever attendance was recorded for a Stoke first team match when 394 people saw Stoke play Oldham Athletic at Boundary Park in October 1916. Stoke's best victory in the 1916–17 season was a 7–0 over Bolton Wanderers which was sweet revenge after they had beaten Stoke 9–2 earlier in the season.

Final league table

Lancashire Section Primary Competition

Lancashire Section Secondary Competition Group D

Results

Stoke's score comes first

Legend

Lancashire Section Primary Competition

Lancashire Section Secondary Competition Group D

Squad statistics

References

Stoke City F.C. seasons
Stoke